Rearview Mirror is a 1984 American TV movie directed by Lou Antonio. The script was by Lorenzo Semple Jr. based on a novel by Caroline B. Cooney which had been published in 1980.

Premise
Jerry Sam Hopps, an escaped convict and psychopathic murderer and his cousin terrorize a woman, Terry Seton, and force her to drive them through North Carolina, with a separately kidnapped baby. A visiting police detective pursues.

Cast
Lee Remick as Terry Seton
Tony Musante as Vince Martino
Michael Beck as Jerry Sam Hopps
Jim Antonio as Chief Yates
Don Galloway as Roger Seton
Ned Bridges as Powell

Production
The film was made in October 1984.

Reception
The New York Times said "one begins to wonder early on, did a bunch of nice actors get caught in a kinky and pointless exercise like this?"

The Chicago Tribune called it "scary but goofy."

The Washington Post called it "a strikingly well-done nail biter."

References

External links
Review of 1980 novel at Kirkus

1984 films
1984 television films
American television films
Films directed by Lou Antonio